James Archibald Brown Scott was a Scottish amateur football centre half who played in the Scottish League for Queen's Park. He was capped by Scotland at amateur level.

References 

Scottish footballers
Queen's Park F.C. players
Scottish Football League players
Scotland amateur international footballers
Association football wing halves
Year of death missing
People from Partick
1905 births